We Are The Grand is a Chilean band and indie rock musical quartet. The group was formed in 2009 by Sebastián Gallardo (vocalist, guitar), Fernando Lamas (guitar), Juan Aguirre (bass) and Matías Peralta (drums) in Santiago, Chile.

History 
The band was originally called "The Grand", but it changed after learning of a Norwegian band with the same name.

The group's music style is heavily influenced by indie rock of the 90s, and sounds similar to groups such as The Libertines, Franz Ferdinand, and Kasabian. They received positive reviews for the singles "Save Me", "Faint", "Ecstasy", "I Am" and "Do You Remember the First Time?".

Their first studio album released in 2012 was titled Until the Morning, and later released EPs in 2009 and 2010, titled The Grand and Chasing Lights, respectively.

The second studio album, Volver, was released on March 8, 2016. It was initially released as a free download for 24 hours. An official album release show took place a month later at Teatro Nescafe De Las Artes.

Band members

Current members
 Sebastián Gallardo – vocal, guitar
 Fernando Lamas – guitar
 Juan Aguirre – bass
 Benjamín Galdames – drum

Discography 
Studio albums
 Until the Morning (2012)
 Volver (2016)
 Raíz (2018)

EPs
 The Grand (2009)
 Chasing Lights (2010)

References

External links 

 

Chilean alternative rock groups
Musical groups established in 2009